Kelvin Grove is a residential neighbourhood in the southwest quadrant of Calgary, Alberta. It is bounded to the north by Glenmore Trail, to the east by Elbow Drive, to the south by 75 Avenue S and to the west by 14 Street W. The Rockyview General Hospital is located immediately west of the community.

Kelvin Grove was established as a neighbourhood in 1957. It is represented in the Calgary City Council by the Ward 11 councillor.

Demographics

Residents in this community had a median household income of $84,960 in 2015.

Education
The community is served by Chinook Park Bilingual Elementary and Henry Wise Wood Senior High public schools.

See also
List of neighbourhoods in Calgary

References

External links
Chinook Park, Kelvin Grove, Eagle Ridge Community Association

Neighbourhoods in Calgary